The Provo Third Ward Chapel is a historic building located in Provo, Utah. It was listed on the National Register of Historic Places on April 2, 1979.

Construction

Under the direction of Bishop Thomas N. Taylor, the Provo 3rd Ward chapel was completed in 1903, exemplifying one of the first English Parish Gothic churches in Utah.  The building was designed by architect Richard C. Watkins, native of Provo. The cornerstone was laid in a ceremony on April 25, 1901.  An adjoining amusement hall was built in 1913, and the entire interior was redone in the late 1930s under the direction of architect Fred L. Markham.

History 
In 1901 the recently formed Provo Third Ward of the Utah Stake was responsible for the construction of a new chapel. Using primarily local materials and locally employed workers, Bishop Thomas N. Taylor, also the mayor of Provo, and his building committee composed of Arthur Dixon, Edgar Perry, and H. J. Maiben, undertook the project. The cost of the new building was $11,000 and it was completed in 1903. The chapel received an organ that had been used in the Provo Tabernacle in 1907. The adjoining amusement hall was added in 1913, but only the top floor was finished at an additional cost of $15,000.  In 1926 the lower floor of the amusement hall was completed for an additional $5,600. The Provo Third Ward Chapel and Amusement Hall served not only as a chapel for worship, but also provided the Saints with a place to interact socially in forms of dance, musicals, sports, etc. During World War II the amusement hall was transformed to serve as army barracks for Army Specialized Training Units associated with Brigham Young University.

Later use and ownership
The building was eventually vacated by the LDS Church in the year 1979 and sold. Subsequently, it has been used for various purposes including serving as the Ivy Tower dance club between 1989 and 1992. Other occupants included Scampi's restaurant and private academies. From 1992 to 2021 it has been owned and operated by the Discovery Academy, a therapeutic boarding school. Since 2022, Discovery Day, a day treatment center for troubled youth began working from the building. The Provo 3rd Ward Chapel was designated to the historic Provo Landmark register on April 28, 1995.

It was listed on the National Register of Historic Places in 1979.

Notes 

 National Park Service. "" April 1995.

External links 
NRHP Listings in Provo Utah

Commercial buildings on the National Register of Historic Places in Utah 
Former churches in Utah
Former Latter Day Saint religious buildings and structures
Gothic Revival church buildings in Utah
Meetinghouses of the Church of Jesus Christ of Latter-day Saints in Utah
Prairie School architecture in Utah
Properties of religious function on the National Register of Historic Places in Utah
Churches completed in 1903
National Register of Historic Places in Provo, Utah